Salaam TV is a Philippine government-owned Islamic channel owned by the Presidential Communications Office through the People's Television Network (PTV). The channel's main programming is solely focused on Filipino Muslims and other Islamic communities in the country. At present, the channel is on test broadcast via digital terrestrial television on PTV's digital subchannel (via UHF 14) and Expand to cable television on SkyCable and Destiny Cable Channel 4 depending on the digital boxes' channel availability from 12 noon to 8:00 p.m. Salaam TV is also the second Islamic television network based in the Philippines, following the launch of Davao-based Islamic cable channel Mensahe TV.

The channel launched on July 23, 2017. Former PTV News presenter Princess Habibah Sarip-Paudac, the first Filipina newsreader to wear a hijab on a national television newscast, took role as the station manager of the station.

President Rodrigo Duterte, in his first State of the Nation Address on July 25, 2016, stated that the government will put up two state-run TV channels for Filipino Muslims and the Lumad, hence Salaam TV was established, while the channel for the Lumad is still being planned.

See also
People's Television Network

References

2017 establishments in the Philippines
People's Television Network
Television channels and stations established in 2017
Digital television stations in the Philippines
Islamic television networks
Filipino-language television stations
Religious television stations in the Philippines